April Fools' Day or Poisson d'avril, is a French comedy film from 1954, directed by Gilles Grangier, written by Michel Audiard, starring Bourvil, Annie Cordy, and Louis de Funès.

Plot
Honest garage mechanic, faithful husband and good father, Emile Dupuy was persuaded by the patter of a salesman at a bazaar to buy a cane fishing model with the money intended for his wife Charlotte's dream: a washing machine. Not daring to tell her, he will lie, small lies, wholesale lies, and finds himself in an inextricable situation.

Cast 

 Bourvil : Emile Dupuy 
 Annie Cordy : Charlotte Dupuy
 Louis de Funès : The gamekeeper
 Denise Grey : Clémentine Prévost 
 Pierre Dux : Gaston Prévost 
 Jacqueline Noëlle : Annette Coindet 
 Paul Faivre : Louis 
 Charles Lemontier : M. André
 Jean Hébey : M. Dutreille
 Nono Zammit : M. Gauthier
 Guy Loriquet : Léon
 Gérard Sabatier : Jacky
 Zeimet : Germain
 Louis Bugette : The garage's owner
 Maurice Biraud : The seller of fishing equipment
 Suzanne Grey : The neighbor
 René Havard : The examiner
 Gérard Darrieu : The delivery guy
 Charles Denner : A café's client

References

External links 
 
 Poisson d’avril (1954) at the Films de France

1954 films
French comedy films
1950s French-language films
French black-and-white films
Films directed by Gilles Grangier
Films with screenplays by Michel Audiard
1954 comedy films
1950s French films